The Marchiazza is a 34 km long stream of Piedmont, in north-western Italy. It is a left side tributary of the Cervo which flows through the provinces of Biella and Vercelli.

Geography 

The Marchiazza is formed in the eastern and hilly part of the Alpi Biellesi from the confluence of several streams; the longest of them is named Rio della Moja and has its source on the southern slopse of Cima Frascheja (625 m, municipality of Sostegno). The Marchiazza flows close to the village of Lozzolo and comes out of the hills entering the Po plain. In the territory of Gattinara it receives the waters of its mail natural tributary named Rio della Marchiazzola. Heading south in crosses the Baraggia heathland and then the paddy fields of the province of Vercelli. Between Albano Vercellese and Villarboit the Marchiazza is overpassed by Canale Cavour (one of the main irrigation canals in Italy) through a water bridge.
In its lowest course the stream receives the waters of several small canals and part of its water is diverted for irrigation purposes. Near Collobiano the Marchiazza end its course flowing into the river Cervo at 136,7 matres s.l.m.

See also 
 Alpi Biellesi

References

External links
 

Rivers of the Province of Biella
Rivers of the Province of Vercelli
Rivers of the Alps
Rivers of Italy